IOOF Building is a historic building in Kingman, Arizona. The two-story building was built in 1912. The building was in the Mission/Spanish Revival style. This was the second fraternal organization clubhouse in Kingman. In 1922, the first fire station in Kingman was built next door. IOOF is the Independent Order of Odd Fellows. Today, IOOF no longer uses the building, and it serves as a fitness facility called SHIFT Training Center. This building is on the National Register of Historic Places and the number is 86001150.

It was evaluated for National Register listing as part of a 1985 study of 63 historic resources in Kingman that led to this and many others being listed.

References

Buildings and structures completed in 1912
Buildings and structures in Kingman, Arizona
Clubhouses on the National Register of Historic Places in Arizona
Odd Fellows buildings in Arizona
1912 establishments in Arizona
National Register of Historic Places in Kingman, Arizona